The Hell of Manitoba is a 1965 West-German-Spanish-Italian western film directed by Sheldon Reynolds and starring Lex Barker, Pierre Brice and Gérard Tichy. In the United States it was released under the alternative title of A Place Called Glory.

Production
The production re-teamed Barker and Brice who were currently starring in a series of popular Karl May westerns. The film's sets were designed by the art directors Enrique Alarcón and Heinrich Weidemann. It was shot at studios in Barcelona as well as on location in Andalucía.

Synopsis
Two celebrated gunfighters are separately hired to come to a small Canadian town in Manitoba named "Glory" and fight each other. Instead they join forces and take on a bandit gang that dominates the area.

Cast

References

Bibliography 
 Bergfelder, Tim. International Adventures: German Popular Cinema and European Co-Productions in the 1960s. Berghahn Books, 2005.

External links 
 

1965 films
1960s historical films
1965 Western (genre) films
German Western (genre) films
West German films
German historical films
German multilingual films
1960s German-language films
Spanish multilingual films
Spanish historical films
Spanish Western (genre) films
Italian historical films
Italian Western (genre) films
Italian multilingual films
Films directed by Sheldon Reynolds
Gloria Film films
Films set in Manitoba
Films set in the 19th century
Films shot in Almería
1960s multilingual films
1960s Italian films
1960s German films